Ernest "Ernie" Field (6 February 1943 – 2 May 2013) was an English Amateur Boxing Association of England amateur middleweight and professional light heavy/cruiserweight boxer and rugby league footballer who played in the 1960s.

Background
Ernie Field was born in Wakefield, West Riding of Yorkshire, England, he initially lived at Bottomboat, near Stanley, later moving to Outwood, and he studied at Stanley Secondary Modern. He died at Snapethorpe Hall Care Home, Wakefield from throat cancer (Oropharyngeal cancer) having developed Dementia. Outside boxing he worked initially as a Motor mechanic, then as a Fitter for the National Coal Board at Lofthouse Colliery (Wakefield), Bouncer, Paviour (Paver), and general construction worker.

Boxing career

Amateur
Ernie Field trained at the Robin Hood & Thorpe Amateur Boxing Club (ABC), he was the National Coal Board British Middleweight Champion, he fought internationally for the Amateur Boxing Association of England; including against Hungary with a points victory over Hungarian amateur middleweight champion Tibor Borda (born circa-1939), of Bonyhádi Spartacus, at King's Hall, Belle Vue, Manchester on Monday 11 November 1963, and fought overseas; including a tournament in Castrop-Rauxel, West Germany.

Professional
Cruiserweight, managed by Tommy Miller, Ernie Field's first professional boxing bout took place against Louis Samuels on Monday 7 March 1966, he built-up an initial record of six wins (4 knockouts), five defeats by points, and one draw by March 1967, including; a points victory over Tony Moore on the undercard of the Muhammad Ali versus Henry Cooper bout for the Heavyweight Championship of the World in front of a crowd of 46,000 at Arsenal Stadium, Highbury on Saturday 21 May 1966, and a second-round technical knockout of future British and British Commonwealth light-heavyweight Champion Eddie Avoth at Wyvern Sporting Club (Midland Hotel), Manchester on Monday 30 January 1967, despite initially being a Middleweight, he began to be matched against Heavyweights, e.g. Rocky Campbell and Peter Boddington, and this resulted in a downturn in his career, losing his last seven bouts, with five by points decisions, of which four were by narrow margins, including a bout outside of the United Kingdom, against South African light-heavyweight Champion Jan Happy Pieterse at Johannesburg City Hall Johannesburg, South Africa on Monday 18 March 1968, his final professional bout took place against Gene Innocent on Monday 13 May 1968. Ernie Field was scheduled to compete with Ray Ako for the vacant Central (England) Area light heavyweight title at Liverpool Stadium, Liverpool on Tuesday 17 September 1968, however Ernie Field was forced to withdraw before the bout, and was replaced by Shaun Dolan, Ray Ako beat Shaun Dolan with a third-round knockout.

Amateur boxing record (incomplete)

|-
|align="center" colspan=8|x Wins (x knockouts, x decisions), x Losses (x knockouts, x decisions)
|-
| align="center" style="border-style: none none solid solid; background: #e3e3e3"|Result
| align="center" style="border-style: none none solid solid; background: #e3e3e3"|Record
| align="center" style="border-style: none none solid solid; background: #e3e3e3"|Opponent
| align="center" style="border-style: none none solid solid; background: #e3e3e3"|Type
| align="center" style="border-style: none none solid solid; background: #e3e3e3"|Round
| align="center" style="border-style: none none solid solid; background: #e3e3e3"|Date
| align="center" style="border-style: none none solid solid; background: #e3e3e3"|Location
| align="center" style="border-style: none none solid solid; background: #e3e3e3"|Notes
|-align=left
|Win
|
|align=left| Tibor Borda
|PTS
|3
|11 November 1963
|align=left| King's Hall, Belle Vue, Manchester, Lancashire
|align=left|
|-
|}

Professional boxing record

|-
|align="center" colspan=9|6 Wins (4 knockouts, 2 decisions), 12 Losses (1 knockouts, 11 decisions)
|-
| align="center" style="border-style: none none solid solid; background: #e3e3e3"|Result
| align="center" style="border-style: none none solid solid; background: #e3e3e3"|Record
| align="center" style="border-style: none none solid solid; background: #e3e3e3"|Opponent
| align="center" style="border-style: none none solid solid; background: #e3e3e3"|Weight Class
| align="center" style="border-style: none none solid solid; background: #e3e3e3"|Type
| align="center" style="border-style: none none solid solid; background: #e3e3e3"|Round
| align="center" style="border-style: none none solid solid; background: #e3e3e3"|Date
| align="center" style="border-style: none none solid solid; background: #e3e3e3"|Location
| align="center" style="border-style: none none solid solid; background: #e3e3e3"|Notes
|-align=left
|Loss
|
|align=left| Gene Innocent
|Cruiserweight
|RTD
|2 of 8
|13 May 1968
|align=left| King's Hall, Belle Vue, Manchester, Lancashire
|align=left|
|-
|Loss
|
|align=left| Peter Boddington
|Heavyweight
|TKO
|7 of 8
|9 April 1968
|align=left| Empire Pool, Wembley, London
|align=left|
|-
|Loss
|
|align=left| Jan Happy Pieterse
|Cruiserweight
|PTS
|10
|18 March 1968
|align=left| Johannesburg City Hall, Johannesburg, Gauteng, South Africa
|align=left|
|-
|Loss
|
|align=left| Des Cox
|Cruiserweight
||PTS
|8
|13 February 1968
|align=left| East India Hall, Poplar, London
|align=left|
|-
|Loss
|
|align=left| Rocky Campbell
|Heavyweight
|PTS
|8
|15 January 1968
|align=left| Raynors Sporting Club (Grand Hotel), Leicester, Leicestershire
|align=left|
|-
|Loss
|
|align=left| Johnny Hendrickson
|Cruiserweight
|PTS
|8
|7 May 1967
|align=left| World Sporting Club (Grosvenor House Hotel), Mayfair, London
|align=left|
|-
|Loss
|
|align=left| Leweni Waqa
|Cruiserweight
|PTS
|10
|27 April 1967
|align=left| Colston Hall, Bristol, Somerset
|align=left|
|-
|Win
|
|align=left| Charlie Wilson
|Cruiserweight
|PTS
|8
|29 March 1967
|align=left| Manor Suite, Porthcawl, Wales
|align=left|
|-
|Draw
|
|align=left| Lloyd Walford
|Cruiserweight
|PTS
|8
|7 March 1967
|align=left| Free Trade Hall, Manchester, Lancashire
|align=left|
|-
|Win
|
|align=left| Eddie Avoth
|Cruiserweight
|TKO
|2 of 8
|30 January 1967
|align=left| Wyvern Sporting Club (Midland Hotel), Manchester, Lancashire
|align=left|
|-
|Loss
|
|align=left| Dave Barber
|Cruiserweight
|PTS
|8
|29 November 1966
|align=left| Leeds Town Hall, Leeds, Yorkshire
|align=left|
|-
|Loss
|
|align=left| Jimmy Tibbs
|Cruiserweight
|PTS
|8
|25 October 1966
|align=left| Royal Albert Hall, Kensington, London
|align=left|
|-
|Win
|
|align=left| Vernon Allen
|Light heavyweight
|KO
|6 of 8
|10 October 1966
|align=left| Free Trade Hall, Manchester, Lancashire
|align=left|
|-
|Loss
|
|align=left| Eddie Avoth
|Light heavyweight
|PTS
|8
|19 September 1966
|align=left| Wyvern Sporting Club (Midland Hotel), Manchester, Lancashire
|align=left|
|-
|Loss
|
|align=left| Dave Barber
|Light heavyweight
|PTS
|6
|6 September 1966
|align=left| Empire Pool, Wembley, London
|align=left|
|-
|Win
|
|align=left| Tony Moore
|Light heavyweight
|PTS
|6
|21 May 1966
|align=left| Arsenal Stadium, Highbury, London
|align=left|
|-
|Loss
|
|align=left| Tom Calderwood
|Light heavyweight
|PTS
|6
|25 April 1966
|align=left| New St James Hall, Newcastle upon Tyne, Northumberland
|align=left|
|-
|Win
|
|align=left| Tom Calderwood
|Light heavyweight
|TKO
|5 of 6
|22 March 1966
|align=left| Tower Circus, Blackpool, Lancashire
|align=left|
|-
|Win
|
|align=left| Louis Samuels
|Light heavyweight
|TKO
|4 of 6
|7 March 1966
|align=left| Sheffield City Hall, Sheffield, West Riding of Yorkshire
|align=left|
|}

Genealogical information
Ernie Field was the son of Harry Field, and Florence 'Flo'/'Florrie' "Queenie" (née Smith), and the older brother of Richard Field, and Douglas Edward "Tiny" Field.

Funeral
Ernie Field's funeral took place at Wakefield Crematorium, Crigglestone at 1pm on Monday 20 May 2013, and was attended by family and friends, including; rugby league footballers Dave Sampson (who read the eulogy), Dean Sampson, Avis Sampson (wife of Malcolm Sampson), and Melvin Castle (husband of Denise Castle), and boxers Alan Richardson, Keith Tate, Steve Butler, and White Rose Boxing Club trainer John Hall, the funeral's entrance music was The Beatles' In My Life, and the exit music was Glen Campbell's version of Green Day's Good Riddance (Time of Your Life).

References

External links
 
 Tributes to middleweight boxing champion Ernie Field
 Ernie Field at facebook.com
 Search for "Ernie Field" at britishnewspaperarchive.co.uk
 Search for "Ernie Fields" at britishnewspaperarchive.co.uk
 Search for "Ernest Field" at britishnewspaperarchive.co.uk
 Search for "Ernest Fields" at britishnewspaperarchive.co.uk

1943 births
2013 deaths
Bramley RLFC players
Cruiserweight boxers
English male boxers
English rugby league players
Light-heavyweight boxers
Middleweight boxers
Rugby league centres
Rugby league locks
Rugby league players from Wakefield
Sportspeople from Wakefield